Heavy Duty is a fictional character from the G.I. Joe: A Real American Hero toyline, comic books and animated series. Heavy Duty is the G.I. Joe Team's heavy ordnance specialist. He is described as being unafraid of any situation despite heavy enemy fire. He is also the cousin of Roadblock, and shares the same passion for cooking and speaking in rhyme. This character was created by Walter A. McDaniel.

Profile
His original file card indicates that his real name is Lamont A. Morris, and that he was born in Chicago, Illinois. Heavy Duty grew up with a passion for metropolitan living, expressing it through classical guitars and Bach. After enlisting in the Army, he discovered that many of his skills in music also applied to heavy weapons: coordination, dexterity and multi-tasking. His extreme strength and grasp of advanced weapon systems, brought him to the attention of the G.I. Joe Team.

When the G.I. Joe team disbanded, Heavy Duty returned to his hometown of Chicago, and opened a small, home-based recording studio, where he recorded his renditions of popular classical pieces on guitar. He returned to the team when they were reinstated, and when Roadblock did not initially return to G.I. Joe, Heavy Duty also attempted to fill in his cousin's role as a cook. However, his culinary skills weren't nearly as enthusiastic, and Heavy Duty tended to improvise ingredients and methods.
Roadblock returned when the team roster was scaled down into an elite unit, and a hungry bunch of Joes greatly welcomed him back.

Toy history
The first appearance of Heavy Duty was in the 1991 lineup of the G.I. Joe: A Real American Hero toyline. A new version of Heavy Duty was released in 1993 as part of the Star Brigade line. Although he appeared in very minimal roles in other G.I. Joe media, Heavy Duty was still able to attain some level of popularity despite appearing late in the series. He is one of very few characters from that time to cross over to the G.I. Joe revival in 2002, and is included in G.I. Joe: Sigma 6.

A version of Heavy Duty with no accessories came with the Built to Rule Sledgehammer in 2004. The forearms and the calves of the figure sported places where blocks could be attached.

Comics

Marvel Comics
In other media, Heavy Duty first appeared in issue #130 of the G.I. Joe comics published by Marvel Comics. He was among the group of Joes who defended the Pit from an assault by Cobra.

Devil's Due
He appeared in an issue in the comics published by Devil's Due.

He is later seen in Istanbul, Turkey. He is helping fellow Joes Bombstrike and Taurus fight Cobra soldiers.

IDW comic
In the IDW/Devil's Due series, there is a key character with the codename Heavy Duty, but with the personality and physical looks of Roadblock. He is featured in a two part story. He is part of a running battle in Chicago against an out of control Battle Android Trooper and a group of Dreadnoks and Cobra soldiers. He is wounded halfway through but still continues the fight with the help of other Joes such as Jinx and Lady Jaye. Firefly takes the 'B.A.T.' and most of the Cobras are arrested.

Animated series

DiC
Heavy Duty was featured in both seasons of the DiC-produced G.I. Joe animated series, voiced by Maurice LaMarche.

Spy Troops and Valor vs. Venom
In the direct-to-video CGI animated movie G.I. Joe: Spy Troops, Heavy Duty returns with a more colorful personality, albeit as one who loves explosives. It is mentioned in the film that he is Roadblock's cousin. Like his relative, he shares the same passion in cooking, if not the skills. He returns in G.I. Joe: Valor vs. Venom, and is voiced in both movies by Blu Mankuma.

Sigma 6
Heavy Duty co-stars in the new series, G.I. Joe: Sigma 6. He does not possess the same refinement as his original incarnation. This Heavy Duty is more preoccupied with his brawn, and shows off his muscles as much as he can. He is usually paired with teammate Tunnel Rat.

Renegades
In the G.I. Joe: Renegades episode "Knockoffs", it is revealed Roadblock has a cousin named Hershel. This is probably a reference to the film version of Heavy Duty, instead of his original counterpart.

This was confirmed in "Cousins" when Flint and Lady Jaye call upon Corporal Hershel Dalton when it comes to tracking his cousin Roadblock. In exchange for bringing in Roadblock, Heavy Duty will join the Falcons permanently. It's revealed that Heavy Duty doesn't like Roadblock because of something that went wrong in the past. That's why Heavy Duty moved away from his hometown of Biloxi, Mississippi and moved away to go to college and later live in Idaho. It is revealed he left for the city to make a name for himself. Having grown ashamed of his deep Southern heritage believing to be a handicap towards obtaining an advanced education. Heavy Duty manages to ambush Roadblock after their grandfather's funeral (Captain Jefferson Hinton had served as a pilot in the Tuskegee Airmen).

The two of them are then ambushed by Major Bludd which ends up with Heavy Duty handcuffing himself to Roadblock. Heavy Duty drags Roadblock into his car which leads them into a car chase until Major Bludd ends up blowing up the bridge. Due to Major Bludd firing his laser onto the car as it was sinking, Heavy Duty loses the keys to his handcuffs. Heavy Duty manages to pull himself and Roadblock out of the river and ending up in the swamp while evading alligators. Heavy Duty was surprised that Roadblock was able to fight off the alligator. Major Bludd attacks them in a swamp boat as Roadblock saves Heavy Duty from a snake. After a brief fight, Roadblock and Heavy Duty try to break the handcuffs as Major Bludd arrives and captures them. While Major Bludd prepares a trap for the others, in the midst of which, he reveals that Cobra actually IS dirty, Roadblock and Heavy Duty work to get out the handcuffs.

When an alligator attacks them, Snake Eyes ends up scaring the alligator away. Roadblock and Heavy Duty then join the other Joes in fighting off Major Bludd and Baroness. After the fight, Roadblock and Heavy Duty return to their grandmother's house where she revealed that their grandfather had given his inheritance to both of them making Heavy Duty's animosity towards his cousin end. It was then revealed that Hershel had been nicknamed by Grandma Hinton. She said when Hershel was a baby that he could fill up a diaper like no ones business hence the name Heavy Duty. When Heavy Duty wonders how he is going to explain all of this to Flint, Roadblock tells him that he'll think of something. It's possible Heavy Duty told Flint what he discovered during his mission, as the Falcons aren't seen chasing the Joes for the rest of the season.

Live action film

Adewale Akinnuoye-Agbaje portrays Heavy Duty in the live action movie. His background is rebooted however, as his filecard states his name is Hershel Dalton, and that he was originally a member of the British Armed Forces prior to becoming a G.I. Joe member. He also serves as field commander of the team. Heavy Duty was presumably killed during the airstike of the Joe base in G.I. Joe: Retaliation .

Rapper-Actor Common was originally asked to play the part of Roadblock in the film, but was passed over in favor of Heavy Duty. Before being cast as Rip Cord, Marlon Wayans tried out for the part of Heavy Duty.

Video games
Heavy Duty appears as a playable character in the video game G.I. Joe: The Rise of Cobra voiced by Rodney Saulsberry.

References

External links
 Heavy Duty at JMM's G.I. Joe Comics Home Page
 Heavy Duty at YOJOE.com

Fictional Black British people
Comics characters introduced in 1992
Black characters in animation
Black people in comics
Fictional African-American people
Fictional characters from Chicago
Fictional characters from Illinois
Fictional musicians
Fictional corporals
Fictional military sergeants
Fictional United States Army personnel
Male characters in animation
Male characters in comics
G.I. Joe soldiers